Marija Gedroit (born 21 November 1986) is a Lithuanian handballer who plays for Romanian club SCM Gloria Buzău and the Lithuania national team.

References
 

1986 births
Living people 
Lithuanian female handball players 
Expatriate handball players
Lithuanian expatriate sportspeople in Hungary
Lithuanian expatriate sportspeople in Germany
Lithuanian expatriate sportspeople in Romania
Haukar women's handball players
Lithuanian expatriate sportspeople in Iceland